Tilapia is a genus of cichlid fishes endemic to freshwater habitats in Southern Africa. In the past this was a very large genus including all species with the common name tilapia, but today the vast majority are placed in other genera.

Species and taxonomy
In the past, Oreochromis and Sarotherodon were retained in the genus Tilapia, but these are treated as separate genera by all recent authorities. Even with this more restricted Tilapia, there were indications that the taxonomic treatment was problematic, and in 2013 a review of the group resulted in the removal of most "Tilapia" species to the genera Coelotilapia, Coptodon, Heterotilapia and Pelmatolapia. With these as separate genera, only four species remain in Tilapia:

 Tilapia baloni Trewavas & D. J. Stewart, 1975
 Tilapia guinasana Trewavas, 1936 (Otjikoto tilapia)
 Tilapia ruweti (Poll & Thys van den Audenaerde, 1965) (Okavango tilapia)
 Tilapia sparrmanii A. Smith, 1840 (Banded tilapia)

Temporarily retained here, but belonging elsewhere:
 "Tilapia" brevimanus Boulenger, 1911 – closer to "Steatocranus" irvinei (itself not related to the remaining Steatocranus) and Gobiocichla.
 "Tilapia" busumana (Günther, 1903) – closer to "Steatocranus" irvinei (itself not related to the remaining Steatocranus) and Gobiocichla.
 "Tilapia" pra Dunz & Schliewen, 2010 – closer to "Steatocranus" irvinei (itself not related to the remaining Steatocranus) and Gobiocichla.

References

 

Tilapiini
Fish of Africa
Cichlid genera
Taxa named by Andrew Smith (zoologist)